Anneke Bosch (born 17 August 1993) is a South African cricketer. She made her Women's One Day International cricket (WODI) debut against Australia on 18 November 2016.

In September 2019, she was named in the Terblanche XI squad for the inaugural edition of the Women's T20 Super League in South Africa. Later the same month, she was named in South Africa's Women's Twenty20 International (WT20I) squad for their series against India. She made her WT20I debut for South Africa, against India, on 3 October 2019. On 23 July 2020, Bosch was named in South Africa's 24-woman squad to begin training in Pretoria, ahead of their tour to England.

In April 2021, she was part of the South African Emerging Women's squad that toured Bangladesh. In February 2022, she was named as one of three reserves in South Africa's team for the 2022 Women's Cricket World Cup in New Zealand. In June 2022, Bosch was named in South Africa's Women's Test squad for their one-off match against England Women. She made her Test debut on 27 June 2022, for South Africa against England.

In July 2022, she was named in South Africa's team for the cricket tournament at the 2022 Commonwealth Games in Birmingham, England.

References

External links
 
 

1993 births
Living people
Cricketers from East London, Eastern Cape
South African women cricketers
South Africa women Test cricketers
South Africa women One Day International cricketers
South Africa women Twenty20 International cricketers
Border women cricketers
Free State women cricketers
North West women cricketers
Brisbane Heat (WBBL) cricketers
Cricketers at the 2022 Commonwealth Games
Commonwealth Games competitors for South Africa